Abdulrahman Al-Rashidi (born 18 July 1992) is a Saudi football player who played in the Pro League for Al-Ittihad.

References

1992 births
Living people
Saudi Arabian footballers
Ittihad FC players
Al-Tai FC players
Saudi First Division League players
Saudi Professional League players
Association football defenders